Schöpf is a surname. Notable people with the surname include:

Alessandro Schöpf, Austrian football player
Egon Schöpf, Austrian alpine skier
Oliver Schöpf, Austrian football player
Regina Schöpf, Austrian alpine skier
Stefan Schöpf, Austrian luger

See also
Schöpf-Schulz-Passarge syndrome, an autosomal disorder
Johann David Schoepff (1752–1800), German botanist, zoologist, and physician
Schopf

Surnames from status names